The Ugly Duckling is a 1999 adaption of the classic Hans Christian Andersen story by Jerry Pinkney. It is about a cygnet born amongst ducklings that is bullied, runs away, and eventually grows into a beautiful swan.

A film by Weston Woods was released in 2001, narrated by Lynn Whitfield.

Reception
Common Sense Media, in a review of The Ugly Duckling, wrote "Illustrator Jerry Pinkney's descriptive passages resonate with the splendor of nature's beauty." and "The subtle details incorporated into the scenes .. will encourage children to take another look at this old and familiar story." School Library Journal called it "An artistic tour de force that is worthy of its graceful fine-feathered subject." and The Horn Book Magazine found it "a splendid production."

Publishers Weekly gave a starred review describing Pinkneys illustrations as "supple, exquisitely detailed" and the book overall "A flawlessly nuanced performance by a consummate craftsman."

The Ugly Duckling has also been reviewed by Booklist, Library Talk, Kirkus Reviews, and AudioFile.

Awards
2000 ALA Notable Children's Book - Older Readers 
2000 Caldecott Medal - honor

See also
The Little Match Girl (Pinkney book)
The Nightingale (Pinkney book)

References

1999 children's books
American picture books
Fictional swans
Picture books by Jerry Pinkney
Books about ducks
Picture books based on fairy tales
Works based on The Ugly Duckling